Tanya Lazarova Maslarska (born August 15, 1975) is a Bulgarian former artistic gymnast. She competed at the 1992 Summer Olympics. She is now a competitive coach for girls gymnastics.

References

1975 births
Living people
Bulgarian female artistic gymnasts
Gymnasts at the 1992 Summer Olympics
Olympic gymnasts of Bulgaria